Brian Andersen may refer to:

Brian Andersen (born 1971), Danish international motorcycle speedway rider
Brian Andersen (born 1954), Canadian ice hockey players who was selected by the Minnesota North Stars in the 1974 NHL amateur draft
Brian Andersen, press and communications staff for 2015–16 AaB Fodbold season

See also
Brian Anderson (disambiguation)